Ofira Resnikov Navon (January 1, 1936 – August 22, 1993) was the wife of Yitzhak Navon, the fifth President of Israel.

Biography
Ofira Navon was born in Tel Aviv to Batya and Eliezer Resnikov, both originally from Russia. She earned an MA in education and psychology from the University of Georgia, where she was also a member of the Delta Phi Epsilon sorority, and had professional certification in rehabilitation psychology from Columbia University. She and Yitzhak Navon had two children, Naama and Erez.

As First Lady

During her husband's presidency, from 1978 to 1983,  Navon raised the profile of the president's wife. As First Lady, Navon established the President's Council for the Welfare of the Child. She worked with Jihan Sadat, wife of the Egyptian president, on rehabilitation projects for soldiers wounded in the Arab-Israeli conflict. Navon also pushed for an international treaty to protect children caught in war zones.

Navon was the first Israeli-born presidential wife. With her Ashkenazi upbringing, her marriage to a Sephardi Jew was unusual at the time. The fact that they were parents of small children was another first for the presidency in Israel.

Illness and death
In 1979, Navon was diagnosed with breast cancer and rejected a mastectomy, opting for chemotherapy and a lumpectomy. Later she argued for the right of patients to determine their own treatment. In August 1993, Navon died of leukemia at Hadassah Medical Center in Jerusalem at the age of 57.

References

1936 births
1993 deaths
Deaths from cancer in Israel
Deaths from leukemia
Israeli Ashkenazi Jews
Israeli people of Russian-Jewish descent
Spouses of presidents of Israel
People from Tel Aviv
Burials at Mount Herzl
20th-century women scientists
20th-century psychologists